Wynyard Crossing is a modern double bascule pedestrian and cyclists' bridge built in 2011 in Auckland, New Zealand. It connects the redeveloped Wynyard Quarter with Te Wero Island and the existing Viaduct Harbour entertainment district, and thereby, with the wider Auckland waterfront.

The  bridge is able to lift to allow watercraft passage into the Viaduct Harbour area, with a  channel created by lifting two 22 m movable sections. At high tide, the closed bridge has a 3 m clearance and smaller boats do not require the spans to be raised. Opening and closing the bridge, which takes 90 and 60 seconds respectively, is controlled by an on-site operator contactable by boats via radio.

The bridge was proposed after high costs (estimated at $50 million), combined with the Global Financial Crisis, prevented a more sizable structure (capable of carrying buses and trams) from being built in time for the Rugby World Cup 2011. Instead, a less expensive walking and cycling bridge was constructed from prefabricated sections – though the foundations are strong enough to later bear a more substantial bridge capable of carrying public transport vehicles. The planned cost of the bridge was $3.5 million, and piling works started in January 2011. In April 2011, the first of the two 29-ton spans of the lifting bridge was installed. The bridge opened for the public in early August 2011. It is closed to cyclists and pedestrians when not supervised, as during COVID lockdowns.

Planned construction dates of 2016 and 2020, have not eventuated, despite the temporary bridge having high energy costs and needing frequent and costly repairs. Funding for a replacement will be sought in the 2025 Long Term Plan.

References 

Bridges in Auckland
Bascule bridges
Bridges completed in 2011
2010s architecture in New Zealand
Auckland waterfront
Auckland CBD